The women's 3000 metres event at the 1985 IAAF World Indoor Games was held at the Palais Omnisports Paris-Bercy on 19 January.

Results

References

3000
3000 metres at the World Athletics Indoor Championships